Atyphopsis roseiceps is a moth of the subfamily Arctiinae. It was described by Herbert Druce in 1898. It is found in Rio de Janeiro, Brazil.

References

Arctiinae
Moths described in 1898
Moths of South America